Bob Barnard may refer to:

 Robert Barnard (1936–2013), English crime writer, critic and lecturer
 Bob Barnard (musician) (1933–2022), Australian trumpet and cornet player